Christian Daniel (born March 20, 1984) is a Puerto Rican singer-songwriter and actor.

Early life 
Daniel was born in 1984 in Santurce, San Juan, Puerto Rico, to a Puerto Rican mother and a Cuban father from Pinar del Río, Cuba.

Career 
Daniel is a singer-songwriter. At the age of 17, Daniel recorded his first demo with vocal coach Socky Torres. He sent demos to several recording companies until Emilio Estefan invited him to Miami to record his début album, Christian Daniel (2007). He was the first artist signed to the record label Bad Boy Latino. Several of his songs have charted on various Billboard charts. As of 2015, he has released three studio albums. In addition to music, Daniel has also acted in Telemundo telenovelas including El fantasma de Elena and Santa Diabla.

Personal life 
Daniel moved from Puerto Rico to Miami circa 2007.

Awards 
Daniel was a finalist in the 2016 Latin Billboard Music Awards for Solo Latin Pop Songs Artist of the Year and Latin Pop Song of the Year for his song "Ahora Que Te Vas." In 2017, he was nominated for the category Best Latin Artist by IHeartRadio Music Awards.

Discography

Albums 

 Christian Daniel (2007)
 Todo lo Que Tengo (2011)
 Renacer (2015)

Singles 

 Loco Enamorado (2017)

Filmography 

 El fantasma de Elena
 Santa Diabla

References

External links 

 
 

Living people
American musicians of Cuban descent
21st-century Puerto Rican male singers
Puerto Rican pop singers
Puerto Rican people of Cuban descent
Latin music songwriters
Puerto Rican singer-songwriters
American male singer-songwriters
Musicians from Miami
Singer-songwriters from Florida
1984 births
Spanish-language singers of the United States
People from Santurce, Puerto Rico
Singers from San Juan, Puerto Rico